James Mulligan (born 21 April 1974) is an Irish former footballer who played in the Football League for Bury.

Career
Mulligan was born in Dublin and began his career with Stoke City having joined from St Joseph’s Sallynoggin. He failed to break into the first team at Stoke and spent time out on loan at Telford United, Macclesfield Town, Northwich Victoria and Bury who he joined permanently in 1994. He played 17 league matches for the Shakers, scoring twice before returning to Ireland with Sligo Rovers, Finn Harps and Cork City.

Career statistics
Source:

References

1974 births
Living people
Republic of Ireland association footballers
Association football forwards
English Football League players
Association footballers from Dublin (city)
Stoke City F.C. players
Telford United F.C. players
Macclesfield Town F.C. players
Bury F.C. players
Northwich Victoria F.C. players
Sligo Rovers F.C. players
Finn Harps F.C. players
Cork City F.C. players